Willibrord van Os served as the thirteenth Archbishop of Utrecht from 1814 to 1825.

Early ministry

Before serving as Archbishop of Utrecht, van Os served as grand vicar of the Archbishop of Utrecht.

After the death of Archbishop Johannes Jacobus van Rhijn, King Louis Bonaparte forbade the Chapter of Utrecht to elect a successor. After Louis’ resignation in 1810, the kingdom was annexed to the French Empire, and his brother, Napoleon, visited Utrecht in 1811. According to C.B. Moss, van Os met Napoleon and resisted the emperor’s plan to confiscate the revenues of the Church. Neale writes: “He boldly and resolutely withstood the man to whose iron will Pius VII had yielded.”

Archbishop of Utrecht

Before Napoleon could bring Utrecht into submission to the Roman Catholic Church, the French were driven from the Netherlands, and the Chapter of Utrecht chose van Os as bishop-elect. He was consecrated by Bishop Gisbertus de Jong on 24 April 1814.

Death

Van Os died at Amersfoort on 28 February 1825.

References 

1744 births
1825 deaths
19th-century archbishops
Dutch Old Catholic bishops
People from Hilversum